Akhtar Mohiuddin (born Ghulam Mohiuddin Wani; 17 April
1928  2001), was a Kashmiri novelist, playwright and short story writer, who made significant contribution to the development of modern Kashmiri literature. Born in Srinagar, Jammu and Kashmir, his novel, Dod Dag is considered as the first novel written and published in Kashmiri. He received Sahitya Akademi Award in 1958 for his short story collection Sath Sangar.

His early writing were in Urdu. Sath Sangar and Sonzal are his collection of short stories. He also wrote some plays. The depiction of human nature and handling of human nature are the main features of his writings. The Government of India conferred him the Padma Shri in 1968. He returned the Padma Shri in protest against the hanging of Maqbool Bhat, whom he considered the "National Hero of Kashmir".

Further reading
 

Akhtar Mohiuddin. Enmeshed Life: Translation of a novella originally written in the Kashmiri language Zuv Ti Zolaan, translated by Tasleem Ahmad War.

See also 
List of Sahitya Akademi Award winners for Kashmiri

References

Kashmiri people
Kashmiri writers
1928 births
2001 deaths
Recipients of the Sahitya Akademi Award in Kashmiri
Recipients of the Padma Shri in literature & education
20th-century Indian writers
20th-century Indian male writers